Chris Skinner (born December 18, 1961) is a former Canadian football running back who played ten seasons in the Canadian Football League.

References

1961 births
Living people
Edmonton Elks players
Ottawa Rough Riders players
BC Lions players
Bishop's Gaiters football players
Canadian football running backs
Players of Canadian football from New Brunswick
Sportspeople from Saint John, New Brunswick